Ugam or UGAM may refer to:

 Ugam Range, mountain range in Kazakhstan and Uzbekistan
 Ambrolauri Airport (ICAO code UGAM), Georgia
 Ugam, traditional musical genre from Pahang, Malaysia
 Ugam River, Uzbekistan
 Ugam, village in Yecheon County, South Korea
 Ana G. Méndez University, abbreviated as UGAM